Desmocerus is a genus of beetles in the family Cerambycidae, containing the following species:

 Desmocerus aureipennis Chevrolat, 1855
 Desmocerus californicus Horn, 1881
 Desmocerus palliatus (Forster, 1771)

References

Lepturinae